Flutter in the Dovecote is a 1986 novel by Scottish writer Bruce Marshall.

Plot introduction
It's a comic tale of a Catholic Bishop who learns that a surrealist painting donated to a Mother Superior is in reality indecent. Intelligence services of various countries then become involved.
 

1986 British novels
Novels by Bruce Marshall
Catholic novels